The 2019 Indian general election in Manipur for two Lok Sabha seats was held in two phases on 11 – 18 April 2019. Voters turnout in first phase was 84.21%  and the second phase was 81.16%

Result

Party wise

Constituency wise

Assembly segments wise lead of Parties

Constituency wise

References

2019 Indian general election
Manipur
Indian general elections in Manipur
2010s in Manipur